Neapoli is a suburb of the Thessaloniki Urban Area and a former municipality in the regional unit of Thessaloniki, Greece. Since the 2011 local government reform it is part of the municipality Neapoli-Sykies, of which it is a municipal unit. Neapoli is located northwest of the city center of Thessaloniki. Its neighboring suburbs are those of Polichni, Stavroupoli, Sykies, Thessaloniki and Ampelokipoi. There are eight districts in Neapoli: Neapoli, Piropathon, Kato Anagennisi, Pano Anagennisi, Kountourioti, Troada, Riga Feraiou, Hydragogio.

Geography

Streets
Andrea Papandreou Avenue

People
Giannis Aggelakas, musician
Christos Sartzetakis, former President of Greece

References

External links
Official website 

Populated places in Thessaloniki (regional unit)